Joseph J. Monaghan  is an Australian physicist and emeritus professor at Monash University. He is known in the area of CFD for the development of
the SPH method in 1977.

Honours
 1999 CSIRO Research Achievement Medal 
 2011 Elected Fellow of the Australian Academy of Science
 Honoris Causa Doctor by Universidad Politecnica de Madrid, 2017

References

External links
 website 
 Monash staff entry

Australian physicists
Year of birth missing (living people)
Living people
Fellows of the Australian Academy of Science